Strategic Command is a series of computer video games developed by Fury Software and Battlefront.com, and published by Excalibur Publishing. Since the premiere of Strategic Command: European Theater in 2002, five titles and two expansion packs were released, with the fifth game, The Great War, debuting in 2011.

Strategic Command games are turn-based strategies set in World War II (except of  the Patton Drives East expansion pack and "Strategic Command WWI"). The first two games took place in the European Theatre of World War II, while the third one focused on the Pacific Theatre. The fourth game takes place on a map of the whole world.

Except for the first title (which featured a hex map), the games are played on maps divided into squares ("tiles"), with the player assuming control over either Axis or Allied states of World War II.

Common elements
Strategic Command games are all turn-based strategies, set in World War II (except for the Patton Drives East expansion pack of Strategic Command 2, which also features post-war campaigns and scenarios). In campaigns, the player controls all of either Axis or Allied states. The most important part of the game is commanding the military units, but the player also controls the research of technologies and diplomatic relations. Neutral states may join the war in certain circumstances (for example, in European Theater, Spain may become an Axis state, if other Axis powers first manage to defeat the United Kingdom), or when one side directly declares a war against them.

Apart from campaigns – in which the game takes place on a whole theatre of war – Strategic Command series also feature scenarios taking place on smaller maps, and portraying only single events, such as Operation Market Garden or the 1974 war on Cyprus.

Since Strategic Command 2, weather and diplomatic pressure are modeled in the games. Using diplomatic pressure, the player may eventually persuade a neutral country to either join the war on his side, or to prevent it from becoming his enemy.

Games
The first game in the series, Strategic Command: European Theater, was released in 2002. It was the only Strategic Command game taking place on a hex map, with one hexagon representing 50 miles of terrain. The game featured six campaigns, all taking place on the same map, but with different starting dates. Creating fan-made campaigns was also possible.

The player could choose the neutral states to act  "random", "historical" or "neutral". With the "random" option, neutral states may decide to join the war depending on current situation, while "historical" means joining the war on an exact, historical date, regardless of the circumstances (for example, the USA will always become an Allied country on December 8, 1941). With the "neutral" option, those states won't join the war, unless it will be directly declared against them.

Strategic Command 2: Blitzkrieg, released in 2006, was the first game in the series using maps divided into squares (or "tiles"), once again focusing on the European Theater of World War II (although a free "Global War" campaign was later added with a patch). Unlike the previous installment, Blitzkrieg features not only campaigns taking place on the map of whole Europe and Atlantic Ocean, spreading from 1939 until the end of the war, but also scenarios played on smaller maps, such as Battle of Kursk or Battle of the Bulge. Diplomacy and weather conditions were also added to the game. This time, creating not only fan-made campaigns, but also custom maps was possible.

Two expansion packs were released: Weapons and Warfare and Patton Drives East. The first one added new terrain types, roads and rail lines to the game, while the second one included new campaigns and scenarios, some of them post-World War II or fictional, including the titular "Patton Drives East", which portrays a hypothetical conflict between the US and USSR following the defeat of Nazi Germany.

Strategic Command WWII Pacific Theater, which premiered in 2008, was the first game in the series not taking place in Europe, instead focusing on Asia and the Pacific Ocean theatre of World War II. The game also introduced more advanced options for controlling aircraft carriers and submarines.

Strategic Command WWII Global Conflict, was released in 2010. It takes place on a map of the whole world.

Since then further releases of add-ons to Global Conflict have included larger scale maps and additional unit types initially a "Gold" release followed by Assault on Communism and Assault on Democracy the former being World War II from 1941 mainly relating to USSR and the latter a very much larger (x 4) world map with both a complete World War II scenario plus some extra more localized campaigns.

Reception

Strategic Command games were given average to favorable reviews from game critics. GameSpot described the first game as being "a notch or two above Hasbro's Axis & Allies board game and nowhere near the daunting challenge of Avalon Hill's intimidating Third Reich", concluding that "fans of SSI's Clash of Steel from 1993 will feel right at home". Reviewers noticed a contrast between the game's interesting gameplay and rather plain graphics and sound effects. IGN commented: "loads of substance, but not much style," while Strategy Informer described the second game as being "for the hardcore of turn-based strategists, as otherwise you could soon be finding yourself turned away by the lack of visual and audio passion".

Notes and references

External links
Developer's website
Publisher's website
Strategic Command series at MobyGames

Battlefront.com games
Video game franchises
Video game franchises introduced in 2002
World War II video games